Lennox Grafton (3 December 1919 – 24 March 2017) was a Canadian architect and one of the first women to be trained as architects in Canada. She completed her undergraduate education in University of Alberta during 1938-1941 and graduated from the architectural program in University of Toronto in 1950. Grafton's early works during the same decade focused on schools, churches, and commercial building. These works were complete while she worked in several of Toronto architectural firms. In 1960 she started her own architectural practice, but had to eventually shutter it due to the lack of available funding to scale the business to acquire larger projects.

Following her entrepreneurial venture, Grafton joined Public Works Canada in 1967 and in the following decade was responsible for designing residential schools for the Canadian government most notably for Attawapiskat and Kashechewan in Northern Ontario. As a design and project architect, her work can be found in many communities throughout Ontario. Grafton indicated that the work was quite challenging but interesting. She was pivotal in the overall design the Attawapiskat school and overcoming the technical challenges of constructing the building posed by the location's soil structure, weather and temperature.

Activism
During the 1980s and 1990s, Grafton actively participated in "For the Record", a project organized by the Ontario Women Graduates and funded by the Ontario Heritage Foundation, which sought to document women architects graduating from the University of Toronto architectural program between the 1920s and 1960s.

References

1919 births
2017 deaths
Canadian women architects
People from Brooks, Alberta
University of Toronto alumni
20th-century Canadian architects
University of Alberta alumni
20th-century Canadian women